The 2002 AVC Cup Women's Club Tournament was the 4th staging of the AVC Club Championships. The tournament was held in Bangkok, Thailand.

Preliminary round

Pool A

|}

|}

Pool B

|}

|}

Classification 5th–8th

Semifinals

|}

7th place

|}

5th place

|}

Final round

Semifinals

|}

3rd place

|}

Final

|}

Final standing

Awards
MVP:  Keiko Hara (Hisamitsu)
Best Server:  Piyamas Koijapo (BEC World)
Best Spiker:  Kumiko Sakino (Hisamitsu)
Best Blocker:  Kumiko Sakino (Hisamitsu)
Best Libero:  Sachiko Takahashi (Hisamitsu)
Best Setter:  Keiko Hara (Hisamitsu)

References
Asian Volleyball Confederation

2002
AVC Cup Women's Club,2002
2002 in women's volleyball
Volleyball,AVC Cup Club Tournament